Nookie may refer to:

Music 
 "Nookie" (Limp Bizkit song), 1999
 "Nookie" (Jamesy P song), 2005
 "Nookie", a 2004 song by Jacki-O from the album Poe Little Rich Girl
 "Nookie", a 2019 song by D-Block Europe
 Nookie (Daria Stavrovich), vocalist of Russian alternative metal band Slot

Other 
 Nookie Bear, a puppet handled by British ventriloquist Roger De Courcey